Émilien Viennet (born 6 February 1992 in Besançon) is a French cyclist who rode for . He is a specialist in both road and cyclo-cross.

Palmarés
2009
4th Tour d'Istrie
2010
2nd 2010 European Road Championships junior time trial
2nd Junior National Time Trial Championships
2011
2nd Ronde du Pays basque

References

1992 births
Living people
French male cyclists
Sportspeople from Besançon
Cyclists from Bourgogne-Franche-Comté